Stew Cater (4 February 1952 – 5 February 2005) was a New Zealand cricketer. He played in thirty first-class and ten List A matches for Wellington from 1974 to 1983.

See also
 List of Wellington representative cricketers

References

External links
 

1952 births
2005 deaths
New Zealand cricketers
Wellington cricketers
Cricketers from Nelson, New Zealand